California's 34th district may refer to:

 California's 34th congressional district
 California's 34th State Assembly district
 California's 34th State Senate district